The Washington Patriots were an Ohio–Pennsylvania League minor league baseball team that played in 1905. The C-level club was based in Washington, Pennsylvania and was the first known professional team to come out of that city.  The team was managed by Dan Kline.

References

Defunct minor league baseball teams
Baseball teams established in 1905
1905 establishments in Pennsylvania
Defunct baseball teams in Pennsylvania
Baseball teams disestablished in 1905
Ohio-Pennsylvania League teams